Ladele v London Borough of Islington [2009] EWCA Civ 1357 is a UK labour law case concerning discrimination against same sex couples by a religious person in a public office.

Facts
Lillian Ladele worked as a registrar for marriages, births, and deaths for the London Borough of Islington. Prior to the introduction of the introduction of the Civil Partnership Act 2004, Ladele asked Islington not to designate her a civil partnership registrar. Islington refused this request and following the introduction of the Civil Partnership Act 2004, Islington designated all of its existing registrars as civil partnership registrars as well as marriage registrars. Ladele objected to being required to officiate at civil partnership ceremonies due to her Christian beliefs. Islington disciplined and threatened to dismiss her.  Ladele claimed that this treatment was unlawfully discriminatory, and that she should not be required to perform civil partnerships, taking into account her religious beliefs. Therefore, Ladele made an application to the Employment Tribunal, complaining of direct and indirect discrimination on grounds of religion or belief and harassment.

The Employment Tribunal held that she had been directly and indirectly discriminated against, as well as harassed. The Employment Appeals Tribunal reversed the decision, and Ladele appealed to the Court of Appeal. She claimed that allegations of direct discrimination and harassment should have been remitted. Islington and Liberty as intervener argued there was no choice, given the Equality Act (Sexual Orientation) Regulations 2007 to do anything but require Ms Ladele to do her full duties.

Judgment

Court of Appeal
Lord Dyson MR held there was no reason to remit the case on direct discrimination or harassment. The Tribunal erred, because (1) it could not be discrimination to treat all employees in the same way (2) the appropriate comparator was a hypothetical someone who disliked gay people without it being due to a religious belief (3) looking at the plain words of regulation 5 it was clear that Ladele had not been harassed.

So far as indirect discrimination went, it was clear that the council had pursued a legitimate aim that all registrars should perform civil partnership duties as part of its dignity policy. This is performing a purely secular task. Furthermore, her view of marriage was not a core part of Ms Ladele’s religion. The requirement to perform her job’s duties did not prevent her from worshipping as she wished. It is clear that ECHR art 9 is a qualified right. Ms Ladele’s views could not override the employer’s concern to ensure equal respect for the gay community.  "As Lord Hoffmann put it in R(SB) v Governors of Denbigh High School 'Article 9 does not require that one should be allowed to manifest one's religion at any time and place of one's own choosing'."

Smith LJ concurred.

European Court of Human Rights
Ladele made an application to the European Court of Human Rights following the Court of Appeal's decision, claiming that the United Kingdom had discriminated against her on the basis of her religion, contrary to Article 14 taken together with Article 9 of the Convention. She did not argue that her right to freedom of religion had itself been infringed.

Her case was joined with those of three other applicants who had brought similar claims against the UK, and the Court, sitting as a Chamber, delivered judgment in the case of Eweida v United Kingdom [2013] ECHR 37. The Court dismissed her complaint. Permission to appeal to the Grand Chamber of the Court was refused, thus the judgment of the Chamber became final on 27 May 2013.

See also

UK labour law
UK employment equality law

Notes

References

United Kingdom labour case law
Court of Appeal (England and Wales) cases
2009 in case law
2009 in British law
History of the London Borough of Islington
2009 in LGBT history
United Kingdom LGBT rights case law
Harassment case law